Care were an English new wave band formed by Paul Simpson and Ian Broudie in 1983 in Liverpool, England. Care was created after the split of the Wild Swans when singer Paul Simpson (also ex-keyboardist for the Teardrop Explodes) came together with guitarist Ian Broudie (previously of Big in Japan and Original Mirrors). The first single was released in June 1983.

History
Paul Simpson is the vocalist of the Wild Swans, whose songs include the 1981 single "The Revolutionary Spirit". Simpson has said that the Care single "Whatever Possessed You" was originally written by him as a Wild Swans song. An album by Care was recorded but has never been released. The singles "Whatever Possessed You", "Flaming Sword" (a top 50 single in the United Kingdom in 1983) and "My Boyish Days" were released by Camden in 1997 on a compilation album entitled Diamonds & Emeralds, which also included the duo's B-sides, unfinished demos and tracks intended for Love Crowns and Crucifies.

According to AllMusic, Care developed a cult following in Japan and the Philippines (where Care's songs were more popular than they were in their native England), which kept the group's memory alive.

The band broke up in 1985 after the departure of Simpson.

Post-Care
Upon leaving Care, Simpson re-formed the Wild Swans and released two albums Bringing Home the Ashes (1988, Sire) and Space Flower (1990, Sire). Space Flower reunited Broudie and Simpson, with Broudie producing the album and playing guitar. Simpson performed under the moniker Skyray from 1996 to 2006; he re-formed again the Wild Swans in 2008, releasing a new album, The Coldest Winter for a Hundred Years (2011, Occultation Recordings).

Ian Broudie went on to form the Lightning Seeds in the late 1980s, releasing a string of albums which spawned hit singles like "Pure", "Change", "Sugarcoated Iceberg", "The Life of Riley" and "You Showed Me". As a solo artist, Broudie released his first album, Tales Told, in 2004.

Discography

Album
Diamonds & Emeralds (1997)

Singles
"My Boyish Days (Drink To Me)" (1983)
"Flaming Sword" (October 1983) – UK No. 48
"Whatever Possessed You" (March 1984)
"Diamonds and Emeralds" (1984)
"Chandeliers" (1985)

References

External links
[ AllMusic "Care" bio]

English new wave musical groups
English pop music duos
Musical groups from Liverpool
Male musical duos
New wave duos
Arista Records artists